Special Others is a Japanese band that blends improvised jazz with post-rock influences. Their lyrics on non-instrumental songs mix English and Japanese.  The members of the band met in high school and formed the group in 1995. They began performing in 2000 and their first major release, Indy-Ann, remained in the CRJ-tokyo charts for seven weeks.

Their first release on NMNL Records was the EP Ben which entered the Tower Records Shibuya indie chart at No. 1, and No. 2 in the national Tower Records chart. After releasing their second EP, Uncle John, in June 2005, the band played at the Fuji Rock Festival in July.

In June 2006, they released Idol, which was followed by a performance at Daikanyama UNIT in July, the release Aims at Tower Records in October, and the release of their first full album, Good Morning, on November 22.  The band toured with Asian Kung-Fu Generation from late 2006, with guest appearances at five performances across Japan.

Band members 
 (b. 1979) - Drums, vocals
 (b. 1979) - Bass
 (b. 1980) - Guitar, vocals
 (b. 1979) - Keyboard, vocals

Discography

Studio albums 
Ben (2004/08/18) EP/Mini Album
Ben
Ngoro Ngoro
Peacefultree
Cacao
Khechi Khechi
Dubwise (2005/06/10) Limited edition 12" single
[Side-A]
Mellotron
Khechi Khechi (Uchida Naoyuki Dub mix)
[Side-B]
Mellotron (Iwaki Kentarou remix)
Random
Uncle John (2005/06/22) EP/Mini album
Sunshine
Random
Uncle John
Meal
Mellotron
Idol (2006/06/07) EP/Mini album
Idol
Aului
Saudade
Mambo No.5
Quinto
Quinto Limited edition 12" single
[Side-A]
Saudade (Kl mix)
Mambo No.5 (Milch of Source remix)
[Side-AA]
Mambo No.5
Quinto
Aims (2006/10/11) Tower Records limited-edition single
Aims
Mambo No.5 (live)
Mellotron (live)
Good Morning (2006/11/22/)
Aims
Good Morning
Circle
Yagi&Ryota
Around the World
Session
Koya
Comboy
KHN
Door of the Cosmos (The Stars Are Singing Too)
Surdo (2007/04/27) Tower Records limited-edition single
Surdo
Aims (live)
Meltoron (live)
Star (2007/05/23)
Star
Surdo
When You Wish upon a Star
All Things - Part 1
All Things - Part 2
Aului 80 - Self remix
Laurentech (2007/11/14) Tower Records limited-edition single
Laurentech
Star (live)
Ben (live)
Quest (2008/02/06)
Night Paradise
Laurentech
Ovelia
Quest
Bump
Johnson
Apollo
Ubiquitous
ACN
Hankachi
PB (2009/04/01)
Title
PB
Stay
SP in Wednesday
Charlie
Silent
Potato
Twilight
Life
Sunrise
The Guide (2010/10/06)
Wait for The Sun
It's my house
Parabola
The Guide
Luster
Draft
Tomorrow
RCA (MONO)
Go home
Ido
Special Others (2011/11/30)
Sailin' feat. kJ (from Dragon Ash)
Ano Kuni Made feat. Nobuo Ooki (from ACIDMAN) & Atsushi Horie (from STRAIGHTENER)
Karappo feat. Kiyosaku (from MONGOL800)
Iyomante Upopo feat. MAREWREU
Dance In Tsurumi feat. Masafumi Goto (from ASIAN KUNG-FU GENERATION)
Door feat. Cypress Ueno & Roberto Yoshino
Have A Nice Day (2012/10/10)
ROOT
ORION
Raindrops
beautiful world
ORGAN BASS
Hawaiian Secret Beat
barrel
Dance Festival
Provence
Have a Nice Day

See also
List of post-rock bands

References

External links
Official website (Japanese)
Victor Entertainment Special Others page (Japanese)
Special Others Myspace page
YouTube Special Others page
iTunes Special Others page

Japanese post-rock groups
Japanese rock music groups
Japanese musical groups
Musical groups from Kanagawa Prefecture